Chengbei Subdistrict is a subdistrict of Jingyang District, Deyang, Sichuan, People's Republic of China, occupying the northern portion of the district as its name suggests. , it has 24 residential communities (社区) and 2 villages under its administration.

See also 
 List of township-level divisions of Sichuan

References 

Township-level divisions of Sichuan
Deyang
Subdistricts of the People's Republic of China